Hokkai Maru (Japanese: 北海丸) was an auxiliary stores ship of the Imperial Japanese Navy during World War II.

History
Hokkai Maru was laid down on 12 September 1933 by Mitsubishi Zosen K.K. at their Kobe shipyard at the behest of the Nippon Suisan K.K. as a refridgerated deep sea trawler. Her sister trawlers became stores ships  and Hakurei Maru. She was launched on 15 March 1934 and completed on 15 May 1934. She was made of steel. She was a fishing trawler until she was requisitioned by the Imperial Japanese Navy in October 1937. Returned to her owners November-December 1938. Re-requisitioned in 1939. returned to her owners 23 May 1940. Re-requisitioned 7 August 1940.

She was struck from the Navy List on 10 January 1944.

References

1934 ships
Maritime incidents in November 1944
World War II shipwrecks in the Pacific Ocean
Ships built by Mitsubishi Heavy Industries
Ships sunk by American submarines